István Juhász (born 17 July 1945) was a Hungarian football midfielder, who played for Ferencvárosi TC.

He won a goal medal in football at the 1968 Summer Olympics and also participated in UEFA Euro 1972 for the Hungary national football team.

Following the end of his career, he went to live in the U.S..

References

Sources
 Ki kicsoda a magyar sportéletben?, II. kötet (I–R). Szekszárd, Babits Kiadó, 1995, 41. o.,  
 Rejtő László–Lukács László–Szepesi György: Felejthetetlen 90 percek (Sportkiadó, 1977)  
 Dénes Tamás – Rochy Zoltán: A Kupagyőztesek Európa-kupája története (Budapest, 2000)  
 Bocsák Miklós: Hogyan élnek olimpiai bajnokaink? (Budapest, 1998) 
 Rózsaligeti László: Magyar olimpiai lexikon. Budapest: Datus. 2000.  
ftc.hu: A VVK hősei  – Interview with Juhász 
vernarancsfoci.hu: European Cup finals 
ftcbk.eu: Ferencváros in European Cup Finals 
Az FTC örökös bajnokai 

1945 births
Living people
Association football midfielders
Hungarian footballers
Hungary international footballers
Ferencvárosi TC footballers
UEFA Euro 1972 players
Olympic footballers of Hungary
Footballers at the 1968 Summer Olympics
Olympic gold medalists for Hungary
Olympic medalists in football
Medalists at the 1968 Summer Olympics